Agustín Alejandro Destribats (born October 30, 1997) is an Argentinian freestyle wrestler who currently competes at 65 kilograms. A three-time South American champion, Destribats qualified to represent Argentina at the 2020 Summer Olympics when he defeated three–time NCAA Division I National champion Zain Retherford at the 2020 Pan American Olympic Qualification Tournament.

Career 
Destribats started wrestling when he was nine years old in a local club that offered savate, capoeira, and wrestling. In 2013 he won the South American Youth Games in both, freestyle and Greco-Roman and in 2014 he won gold in the Pan American Championships as a cadet in freestyle.

In 2015 he won his first major title at the senior level, earning a gold medal at the South American Championships despite being only 18 years old.

In 2016 he won his second consecutive senior South American Championship and also claimed a Pan American title at the junior level. One of his most successful years of his competitive career was 2017, as he claimed three South American Championships (two at the junior level in both styles and one senior title in freestyle), double-gold (freestyle and Greco) at the junior Pan American Championships and a silver medal at the Brazil Cup.

In 2018, he claimed a silver medal at the South American Games. In 2019, he claimed bronze medals at the Pan American Championships and at the Henri Deglane Challenge.

In 2020, Destribats competed once again at the Pan American Championships, placing third and only losing to two-time age-group World Champion and two-time NCAA Division I champion Yianni Diakomihalis.

After the Pan American Championships, Destribats competed at the Pan American Olympic Qualification Tournament. At the semifinals, he pulled up an upset by defeating the accomplished Zain Retherford (19' World Cup champion, three-time NCAA Division I champion, two-time Dan Hodge Trophy winner and age-group World Champion), whom he pinned early in the first period. He was forced to pull out of the championship match due to a knee injury that was caused during his match with Yianni Diakomihalis at the earlier tournament. The silver medal qualified him to represent Argentina in the 2020 Summer Olympics. Destribats is the first male Argentinian to qualify for the Olympic Games since Paulo Ibire did in 1996.

In 2020, he also won one of the bronze medals in the men's 61 kg event at the Individual Wrestling World Cup held in Belgrade, Serbia. He competed in the 65kg event at the 2022 World Wrestling Championships held in Belgrade, Serbia. He won the gold medal in his event at the 2022 South American Games held in Asunción, Paraguay.

Competitive results

Senior & U23 level

Junior level

Cadet level

Freestyle record 

! colspan="7"| International Senior Freestyle Matches
|-
!  Res.
!  Record
!  Opponent
!  Score
!  Date
!  Event
!  Location
|-
! style=background:white colspan=7 |
|-
|Loss
|39–25
|align=left| Ismail Musukaev
|style="font-size:88%"|6–9
|style="font-size:88%"|August 6, 2021
|style="font-size:88%"|2020 Summer Olympics
|style="text-align:left;font-size:88%;"|
 Tokyo, Japan
|-
! style=background:white colspan=7 |
|-
|Loss
|39–24
|align=left| Sebastian Rivera
|style="font-size:88%"|1–6
|style="font-size:88%" rowspan=2|May 30, 2021
|style="font-size:88%" rowspan=2|2021 Pan American Continental Championships
|style="text-align:left;font-size:88%;" rowspan=2| Guatemala City, Guatemala
|-
|Win
|39–23
|align=left| Dillon Williams
|style="font-size:88%"|4–2
|-
! style=background:white colspan=7 | 
|-
|Win
|38–23
|align=left| Stefan Coman 
|style="font-size:88%"|7–4
|style="font-size:88%" rowspan=3|April 8–11, 2021
|style="font-size:88%" rowspan=3|2021 Dan Kolov - Nikola Petrov International
|style="text-align:left;font-size:88%;" rowspan=3|
 Plovdiv, Bulgaria
|-
|Win
|37–23
|align=left| Adil Ospanov
|style="font-size:88%"|6–3
|-
|Win
|36–23
|align=left| Tornike Katamadze
|style="font-size:88%"|TF 10–0
|-
! style=background:white colspan=7 | 
|-
|Win
|35–23
|align=left| Juan Pablo González
|style="font-size:88%"|TF 12–2
|style="font-size:88%" rowspan=3|January 16, 2021
|style="font-size:88%" rowspan=3|Grand Prix de France Henri Deglane 2021
|style="text-align:left;font-size:88%;" rowspan=3|
 Nice, France
|-
|Loss
|34–23
|align=left| James Green
|style="font-size:88%"|TF 0–11
|-
|Win
|34–22
|align=left| Nikolai Okhlopkov
|style="font-size:88%"|6–5
|-
! style=background:white colspan=7 |
|-
|Win
|33–22
|align=left| Razmik Papikyan
|style="font-size:88%"|5–2
|style="font-size:88%" rowspan=4|December 12–18, 2020
|style="font-size:88%" rowspan=4|2020 Individual World Cup
|style="text-align:left;font-size:88%;" rowspan=4|
 Belgrade, Serbia
|-
|Loss
|32–22
|align=left| Abasgadzhi Magomedov
|style="font-size:88%"|0–7
|-
|Win
|32–21
|align=left| Rahul Aware
|style="font-size:88%"|6–6
|-
|Win
|31–21
|align=left| Ulukbek Zholdoshbekov
|style="font-size:88%"|Fall
|-
! style=background:white colspan=7 | 
|-
|Win
|30–21
|align=left| Zain Retherford
|style="font-size:88%"|Fall
|style="font-size:88%" rowspan=2|March 13–15, 2020
|style="font-size:88%" rowspan=2|2020 Pan American Olympic Qualification Tournament
|style="text-align:left;font-size:88%;" rowspan=2|
 Ottawa, Canada
|-
|Win
|29–21
|align=left| Albaro Rudesindo Camacho
|style="font-size:88%"|7–2
|-
! style=background:white colspan=7 | 
|-
|Win
|28–21
|align=left| Jose Rodriguez
|style="font-size:88%"|TF 10–0
|style="font-size:88%" rowspan=4|March 6–9, 2020
|style="font-size:88%" rowspan=4|2020 Pan American Continental Championships
|style="text-align:left;font-size:88%;" rowspan=4|
 Ottawa, Canada
|-
|Loss
|27–21
|align=left| Yianni Diakomihalis
|style="font-size:88%"|4–7
|-
|Win
|27–20
|align=left| Vincent De Marinis
|style="font-size:88%"|11–2
|-
|Win
|26–20
|align=left| Uber Cuero
|style="font-size:88%"|7–2
|-
! style=background:white colspan=7 | 
|-
|Loss
|25–20
|align=left| Erik Arushanian
|style="font-size:88%"|Fall
|style="font-size:88%" rowspan=2|January 15–18, 2020
|style="font-size:88%" rowspan=2|Matteo Pellicone Ranking Series 2020
|style="text-align:left;font-size:88%;" rowspan=2|
 Rome, Italy
|-
|Win
|25–19
|align=left| Jose Rodriguez
|style="font-size:88%"|6–2
|-
! style=background:white colspan=7 | 
|-
|Loss
|24–19
|align=left| Roman Asharin
|style="font-size:88%"|TF 2–12
|style="font-size:88%"|October 28 – November 3, 2019
|style="font-size:88%"|2019 U23 World Championships
|style="text-align:left;font-size:88%;" |
 Budapest, Hungary
|-
! style=background:white colspan=7 | 
|-
|Loss
|24–18
|align=left| Jaydin Eierman
|style="font-size:88%"|TF 4–15
|style="font-size:88%" rowspan=3|August 9, 2019
|style="font-size:88%" rowspan=3|2019 Pan American Games
|style="text-align:left;font-size:88%;" rowspan=3|
 Lima, Peru
|-
|Loss
|24–17
|align=left| Alejandro Valdés
|style="font-size:88%"|Fall
|-
|Win
|24–16
|align=left| Wilfredo Rodriguez
|style="font-size:88%"|17–10
|-
! style=background:white colspan=7 | 
|-
|Win
|23–16
|align=left| Sixto Auccapiña
|style="font-size:88%"|TF 16–5
|style="font-size:88%" rowspan=4|April 18–19, 2019
|style="font-size:88%" rowspan=4|2019 Pan American Continental Championships
|style="text-align:left;font-size:88%;" rowspan=4|
 Buenos Aires, Argentina
|-
|Loss
|22–16
|align=left| Colton McCrystal
|style="font-size:88%"|6–15
|-
|Win
|22–15
|align=left| Uber Cuero
|style="font-size:88%"|4–2
|-
|Win
|21–15
|align=left| Marcos Wesley De Brito Siqueira
|style="font-size:88%"|TF 10–0
|-
! style=background:white colspan=7 | 
|-
|Loss
|20–15
|align=left| Bernard Futrell
|style="font-size:88%"|0–8
|style="font-size:88%" rowspan=2|February 28 – March 3, 2019
|style="font-size:88%" rowspan=2|2019 Dan Kolov - Nikola Petrov International
|style="text-align:left;font-size:88%;" rowspan=2|
 Ruse, Bulgaria
|-
|Loss
|20–14
|align=left| Jordan Oliver
|style="font-size:88%"|3–3
|-
! style=background:white colspan=7 | 
|-
|Win
|20–13
|align=left| Stefan Coman
|style="font-size:88%"|6–4
|style="font-size:88%" rowspan=4|February 1–3, 2019
|style="font-size:88%" rowspan=4|Grand Prix de France Henri Deglane 2019
|style="text-align:left;font-size:88%;" rowspan=4|
 Nice, France
|-
|Loss
|19–13
|align=left| Nyurgun Skryabin
|style="font-size:88%"|TF 0–10
|-
|Win
|19–12
|align=left| Patryk Olenczyn
|style="font-size:88%"|TF 10–0
|-
|Win
|18–12
|align=left| Viktar Shmuliai
|style="font-size:88%"|Fall
|-
! style=background:white colspan=7 | 
|-
|Loss
|17–12
|align=left| Anthony Montero
|style="font-size:88%"|0–4
|style="font-size:88%" rowspan=5|June 5–7, 2018
|style="font-size:88%" rowspan=5|2018 South American Games
|style="text-align:left;font-size:88%;" rowspan=5|
 Cochabamba, Bolivia
|-
|Win
|17–11
|align=left| Fernando Espinoza
|style="font-size:88%"|TF 10–0
|-
|Win
|16–11
|align=left| Uber Cuero
|style="font-size:88%"|7–0
|-
|Win
|15–11
|align=left| Sixto Auccapiña
|style="font-size:88%"|Fall
|-
|Win
|14–11
|align=left| Freddy Vera
|style="font-size:88%"|TF 11–0
|-
! style=background:white colspan=7 | 
|-
|Loss
|13–11
|align=left| Alejandro Valdés
|style="font-size:88%"|TF 0–10
|style="font-size:88%" rowspan=2|May 3–6, 2018
|style="font-size:88%" rowspan=2|2018 Pan American Continental Championships
|style="text-align:left;font-size:88%;" rowspan=2|
 Lima, Peru
|-
|Win
|13–10
|align=left| Joao Victor Dos Santos Silva
|style="font-size:88%"|TF 10–0
|-
! style=background:white colspan=7 | 
|-
|Loss
|12–10
|align=left| Andres Castaneda
|style="font-size:88%"|6–8
|style="font-size:88%" rowspan=3|November 23–27, 2017
|style="font-size:88%" rowspan=3|2017 Brazil Cup
|style="text-align:left;font-size:88%;" rowspan=3|
 Rio de Janeiro, Brazil
|-
|Win
|12–9
|align=left| Lucas Pav
|style="font-size:88%"|11–7
|-
|Win
|11–9
|align=left| Carlos Murta
|style="font-size:88%"|TF 10–0
|-
! style=background:white colspan=7 | 
|-
|Win
|10–9
|align=left| Marcos Oliveira
|style="font-size:88%"|TF 10–0
|style="font-size:88%"|November 22–23, 2017
|style="font-size:88%"|2017 South American Championships
|style="text-align:left;font-size:88%;" |
 Rio de Janeiro, Brazil
|-
! style=background:white colspan=7 | 
|-
|Loss
|9–9
|align=left| Logan Stieber
|style="font-size:88%"|TF 4–16
|style="font-size:88%"|May 5–7, 2017
|style="font-size:88%"|2017 Pan American Continental Championships
|style="text-align:left;font-size:88%;" |
 Lauro de Freitas, Brazil
|-
! style=background:white colspan=7 | 
|-
|Loss
|9–8
|align=left| Jozsef Molnar
|style="font-size:88%"|6–7
|style="font-size:88%" rowspan=2|January 28–29, 2017
|style="font-size:88%" rowspan=2|Grand Prix de France Henri Deglane 2017
|style="text-align:left;font-size:88%;" rowspan=2|
 Paris, France
|-
|Win
|9–7
|align=left| Salvatore Mannino
|style="font-size:88%"|8–0
|-
! style=background:white colspan=7 | 
|-
|Win
|8–7
|align=left| Uber Cuero
|style="font-size:88%"|
|style="font-size:88%"|November 16–19, 2016
|style="font-size:88%"|2016 South American Championships
|style="text-align:left;font-size:88%;" |
 Cartagena, Colombia
|-
! style=background:white colspan=7 | 
|-
|Loss
|7–7
|align=left| Uber Cuero
|style="font-size:88%"|0–8
|style="font-size:88%" rowspan=3|March 5, 2016
|style="font-size:88%" rowspan=3|2016 Pan American Olympic Qualification Tournament
|style="text-align:left;font-size:88%;" rowspan=3|
 Frisco, Texas
|-
|Loss
|7–6
|align=left| Yowlys Bonne
|style="font-size:88%"|Fall
|-
|Win
|7–5
|align=left| Andre Quispe
|style="font-size:88%"|8–4
|-
! style=background:white colspan=7 | 
|-
|Loss
|6–5
|align=left| Baron Andry Jose
|style="font-size:88%"|11–14
|style="font-size:88%"|February 26–28, 2016
|style="font-size:88%"|2016 Pan American Continental Championships
|style="text-align:left;font-size:88%;" |
 Frisco, Texas
|-
! style=background:white colspan=7 | 
|-
|Loss
|6–4
|align=left| Ogonowski Tomasz
|style="font-size:88%"|TF 3–13
|style="font-size:88%"|January 29–31, 2016
|style="font-size:88%"|2016 Dan Kolov - Nikola Petrov International
|style="text-align:left;font-size:88%;" |
 Sofia, Bulgaria
|-
! style=background:white colspan=7 | 
|-
|Win
|6–3
|align=left| Samuel Alva
|style="font-size:88%"|
|style="font-size:88%" rowspan=4|November 13–15, 2015
|style="font-size:88%" rowspan=4|2015 South American Championships
|style="text-align:left;font-size:88%;" rowspan=4|
 Buenos Aires, Argentina
|-
|Win
|5–3
|align=left| Carlos Fernandez
|style="font-size:88%"|
|-
|Win
|4–3
|align=left| Andre Quispe
|style="font-size:88%"|
|-
|Win
|3–3
|align=left| Marvin Chavez
|style="font-size:88%"|
|-
! style=background:white colspan=7 | 
|-
|Loss
|2–3
|align=left| Steven Takahashi
|style="font-size:88%"|TF 0–10
|style="font-size:88%" rowspan=2|April 24–26, 2015
|style="font-size:88%" rowspan=2|2015 Pan American Continental Championships
|style="text-align:left;font-size:88%;" rowspan=2|
 Santiago, Chile
|-
|Win
|2–2
|align=left| Juan Rubelin Ramirez Beltre
|style="font-size:88%"|Fall
|-
! style=background:white colspan=7 | 
|-
|Loss
|1–2
|align=left| Stevan Mićić
|style="font-size:88%"|TF 0–11
|style="font-size:88%" rowspan=3|January 28–31, 2015
|style="font-size:88%" rowspan=3|2015 Dave Schultz Memorial International
|style="text-align:left;font-size:88%;" rowspan=3|
 Colorado Springs, Colorado
|-
|Win
|1–1
|align=left| Dylan Bray
|style="font-size:88%"|7–6
|-
|Loss
|0–1
|align=left| Joe Colon
|style="font-size:88%"|Fall
|-

References

External links 
 
 
 
 Agustin Destribats at the 2019 Pan American Games

1997 births
Living people
Argentine male sport wrestlers
Olympic wrestlers of Argentina
Wrestlers at the 2014 Summer Youth Olympics
Wrestlers at the 2020 Summer Olympics
South American Games gold medalists for Argentina
South American Games silver medalists for Argentina
South American Games medalists in wrestling
Competitors at the 2018 South American Games
Competitors at the 2022 South American Games
Pan American Games competitors for Argentina
Pan American Wrestling Championships medalists
Wrestlers at the 2019 Pan American Games